The Reich Ministry of Armaments and War Production was established on March 17, 1940, in Nazi Germany. Its official name before September 2, 1943, was the 'Reichsministerium für Bewaffnung und Munition'. 

Its task was to improve the supply of the Wehrmacht with the necessary supplies of weapons and ammunition.

Ministers

References

Albert Speer
Ministries established in 1940
Ministries disestablished in 1945
1940 establishments in Germany
1940 disestablishments in Germany
Armaments and War Production